The first season of the Naruto anime series is directed by Hayato Date, and produced by Pierrot and TV Tokyo. Based on Masashi Kishimoto's manga series, the season follows Naruto Uzumaki living in the Hidden Leaf Village, determined to become the next Hokage and gain the respect of the villagers. The first season ran from October 3, 2002 to November 5, 2003 on TV Tokyo. 

The English dub ran from September 10, 2005 to November 4, 2006 on Cartoon Network's Toonami programming block in the United States and YTV's Bionix programming block in Canada.  The season's first 52 episodes ran on Adult Swim's relaunched Toonami block in a completely uncut format from December 1, 2012 to November 30, 2013. After the 52nd episode, it was removed from the schedule rotation to make room for its successor series, Naruto: Shippuden.

In Japan, the season released in both VHS and DVD format. A total of twelve volumes were released by Sony Pictures Entertainment between January 1 and December 3, 2003. Episodes from this season were later released on nine DVD compilations by Viz Media between March 28, 2006 and February 20, 2007, with two compilations of thirteen and twelve episodes released for the first season. The first of these compilations was nominated at the American Anime Awards for best package design. In 2009, Viz released another two DVD boxes containing episodes 1-25 and 26-52, respectively.

Seven pieces of theme music are used for the episodes; three opening themes and three closing themes in the Japanese episodes and a single theme for the openings and endings in the English-dubbed version. Sadness Into Kindness) by Little By Little (used for episodes 51 to 57). The three closing themes are "Wind" by Akeboshi (used until episode 25), "Harmonia" by Rythem (used for episodes 26 to 50), and "Viva Rock" by Orange Range (used for episodes 51 to 57). The opening and ending theme for the English airing is "Rise" by Jeremy Sweet and Ian Nickus, with an instrumental version played as the closing theme.


Episode list

References

2002 Japanese television seasons
2003 Japanese television seasons
Naruto episodes